Armed and Dangerous is a 1986 American comedy film directed by Mark L. Lester and starring John Candy, Eugene Levy, Robert Loggia and Meg Ryan. It was filmed on location in and around Los Angeles, California.

Plot
LAPD Officer Frank Dooley is framed for stealing a television set by two corrupt detectives. He is dismissed from the force, but escapes criminal punishment. The court's next case features hapless defense attorney Norman Kane attempting to defend a white supremacist leader, who threatens him with death should Kane fail to keep him out of prison. Kane reveals his ineptitude and the death threat to the judge, who agrees to render a long sentence if Kane promises to leave law behind.

Dooley and Kane meet when they both apply for work at Guard Dog Security, run by Captain Clarence O'Connell and part of a union represented by Klepper and Lazarus. Becoming licensed security guards after a single afternoon of training, Dooley and Kane are made partners by supervisor Maggie Cavanaugh and assigned to night duty at a pharmaceutical warehouse. Ordered to take a lunch break by senior guard Bruno, Kane happens upon an armed robbery of the warehouse and calls Frank for help, but they prove no match for the thieves.

The next day, the pair are berated by O'Connell for their failure. While they are venting their anger toward O'Connell, Maggie reveals that she is his daughter. Dooley and Kane then attend a meeting of the union, where Kane's attempt to file a grievance against Guard Dog is quashed by union president Michael Carlino. Kane pointedly questions Carlino about how the union dues, adding to about $4 million per year, are spent. After Kane rejects an evasive answer from treasurer Lou Brackman, Carlino threatens Kane should he ever attend another union meeting.

Over the next few days, Dooley and Kane find themselves assigned to work at a landfill and a toxic waste dump. Convinced something illegal is afoot after hearing a story from two fellow security guards about a similar robbery, the pair track down Bruno at his gym and interrogate him. Bruno admits that O'Connell had him order them to lunch the night of the robbery. They visit an informant friend of Dooley's for information on Carlino and bring their suspicions to Maggie, but she rejects them for having no evidence.

Dooley and Kane next attend a party thrown by Carlino, hoping to gather some evidence. Eavesdropping on a meeting between Carlino and Brackman, they learn that Carlino is using the pension fund to finance dealings with a drug cartel and plans to have the money robbed from an armored car, with insurance covering the loss. Fearing the insurance company will investigate, Brackman urges Carlino not to execute the robbery. Carlino instructs Klepper and Lazarus to kill Brackman. Dooley and Kane attempt to save Brackman, but are too late to prevent his murder. After a night spent evading police, the two make plans with Maggie to prevent the armored car robbery. Kane and Maggie take over driving the truck, while Dooley plans to meet them ahead of the would-be robbers.

Dooley has problems with his motorcycle while weaving through a traffic jam on L.A.'s Sixth Street Viaduct and is forced to hitch a ride with a trucker who bulls through the traffic, destroying several cars in the process. Meanwhile, Kane and Maggie avoid assaults from multiple cars attempting to hold them up. Dooley is able to arrive in time to save the armored car from a final attack from Klepper and Lazarus. O'Connell arrives, having captured Carlino and his associates, the two detectives who originally framed Dooley.

The criminals are arrested and Dooley is invited back to the police force, along with a reluctant Kane.

Cast

John Candy as Frank Dooley 
Eugene Levy as Norman Kane 
Robert Loggia as Michael Carlino 
Kenneth McMillan as Captain Clarence O'Connell 
Meg Ryan as Maggie Cavanaugh 
Brion James as Anthony Lazarus 
Jonathan Banks as Clyde Klepper
Don Stroud as Sergeant Rizzo 
Larry Hankin as Kokolovitch 
Steve Railsback as "The Cowboy" 
Tony Burton as "Cappy" 
Larry "Flash" Jenkins as Raisin 
Stacy Keach, Sr. as Judge
Saveliy Kramarov as Olaf
Tommy "Tiny" Lister as Bruno 
James Tolkan as Lou Brackman
Glenn Withrow as Larry Lupik
David Wohl as Prosecutor
Teagan Clive as Staff Member
Tito Puente as Band Leader

Production
The project was initially developed by Harold Ramis as a vehicle for Dan Aykroyd and John Belushi. According to John Candy, John Carpenter was initially attached to direct. Carpenter stated that he dropped out of the project after Aykroyd stipulated that he would not star in the film unless the script was changed to culminate with a car chase.

Ramis said the film "had died a quiet death, and then was resurrected by Brian Grazer, the producer. And Brian said, 'If I can find a director, can I make the movie?' And I said okay." Candy and Tom Hanks were cast, but Hanks dropped out, and Candy recommended Eugene Levy, his costar in Second City Television and Going Berserk (1983), to replace Hanks. Ramis said the film "was not good. I tried to take my name off it. I took my name off in one place", referring to his executive producer credit, which was removed prior to release. Ramis is still credited as a screenwriter, despite his objections.

Release and reception
The film opened in the United States on August 15, 1986 to poor reviews and low sales at the box office. Armed and Dangerous holds a 10% rating on Rotten Tomatoes based on ten reviews.

Reflecting on the movie in 2014, director Mark Lester said, "The movie came out okay, but I wasn't used to working with comedians. I was trying to tell the story and put in some good action scenes, but they didn't care about any of that. They just wanted to be funny."

References

External links

 

1986 films
1980s crime comedy films
Columbia Pictures films
American crime comedy films
American buddy comedy films
1980s English-language films
Films about security and surveillance
Films directed by Mark L. Lester
Films with screenplays by Harold Ramis
Films produced by Brian Grazer
Films with screenplays by PJ Torokvei
Fictional portrayals of the Los Angeles Police Department
1986 comedy films
1980s American films